Circulus arteriosus minor or minor arterial circle of iris is an arterial circle near the pupillary margin of the iris.

References 

Arteries of the head and neck
Human eye anatomy